Peerform is a peer-to-peer lending company based in New York City, which matches prime and near-prime qualified borrowers in the United States to accredited high net worth and institutional investors on its online platform. Its algorithm to determine loan eligibility focuses on a variety of factors including but not limited to FICO scores. In January 2011, Peerform raised $1.3 million during an angel funding round. In April 2014, Peerform raised $1.1 million in a seed funding round led by Corporest Development, a European investment firm.

History
The company was founded in 2010 by Mikael Rapaport, Meytal Benichou and Elie Galam.

In April 2014, Peerform entered into several agreements under which institutional lenders will fund whole loans on Peerform's platform with a fixed interest rate set by Peerform's algorithm. Time (magazine) has since listed Peerform as one of the "three principal U.S. players" in the peer-to-peer lending industry.

Business Model
Peerform provides an online personal loan platform which acts as a marketplace between potential borrowers and investors who lend money. By matching borrowers with investors, Peerform offers its investors access to a personal loan asset class in a US market which is reported to have grown by 176.6% per year between 2008 and 2013. Peerform only accepts accredited investors under SEC Reg D Rule 506(c) or institutional investors to lend money on its platform. Borrowers are screened on a variety of factors so as to ascertain what Peerform defines as “creditworthiness”. Peerform accepts near-prime (see Subprime lending) and prime borrowers with Credit Scores as low as 600 (and above). Each borrower is presented a fixed APR (and fixed interest rate) with an equal repayment scheme that allows them to pay back the loan in automatic bank debits spread out over 3 years.

Investors choose between funding a whole loan or a fraction of a loan. A “whole loan” is where a single borrower receives money from a single investor, whereas with a “fractional loan”, a loan is syndicated among multiple investors. Loans range from a minimum of $1,000 to a maximum of $25,000, which has increased from an earlier maximum loan of $15,000.

Peerform Loan Analyzer
The Peerform Loan Analyzer is the unique algorithm used to determine if a person can qualify for a Peerform personal loan.  According to Peerform, FICO scores cannot solely determine whether or not someone can qualify for a loan.  FICO is one of many factors used in determining this qualification as well as in setting the borrower's interest rate, but other factors, such as a borrower's total current debt-to-income ratio and the number of recent credit inquiries into the borrower's credit history, are taken into account among other things.  The Peerform Loan Analyzer also uses empirical methods instead of standard filters in determining a borrower's APR rate, which the company believes will better calculate consumer credit risk.

Board of Directors and Management
In addition to Rapaport and Benichou, Gregg Schoenberg joined Peerform's Board of Directors in April 2012 and serves as its Executive Chairman.  Abigael Saal serves as Peerform's CTO, Catheryn Robinson as Head of Business Development and Ari Afilalo as General Counsel. Charles-David Ohayon joined the Peerform Board of Directors in April 2014.  Fred Smajda recently joined Peerform as their new Chief Risk Officer.

References

External links 
 

Financial services companies based in New York City
American companies established in 2010
Peer-to-peer lending companies
Financial services companies established in 2010